Fort Ternan is a small town in  Kericho County, Kenya, located 50 kilometres east of Kisumu and five kilometres east of Koru. It is named after Col. Trevor Ternan C.M.G.D.S.O. Fort Ternan is located at the western border of the former Rift Valley Province. Fort Ternan forms a ward of Kipkelion West Constituency and Kipsigis town council. Fort Ternan is also a location in the Chilchila  division.

Transport 
It is served by a railway station on the branch line to Kisumu on the national railway system. The railway is heavily graded in the vicinity of this station.

The Highway Construction running From Nakuru To Kisumu through Londiani has connected the town to Kericho and Kisumu. There are local road leading to highly productive highland areas like Kipsinende, Cherara, Kokwet, Chepkechei, Koisagat, Chepkitar, Lelu etc.

Paleontology 
Fossils of the specimen Kenyapithecus were first found by Louis Leakey in Fort Ternan in 1962. There is a prehistoric site and museum about 15 km from Fort Ternan Town.

Economic activity 
The main economic activity is cash crop farming. Coffee, sugar cane and tea (in a few high altitude areas) are grown in small-scale holding farms. Adjacent to the town is Kipkelion Coffee millers where most of the coffee is supplied by farmers.

Other crops grown around the town are subsistence crops such as maize, beans, tomatoes, potatoes, etc.

Education 
The town is surrounded by a number of both primary and secondary schools. There is also an upcoming institute – Kipsinende Technical Institute.

See also 
 Railway stations in Kenya

References 

Populated places in Rift Valley Province
Kericho County
Rift Valley Province